The Ambassador from Israel to Lesotho is Israel's foremost diplomatic representative in Lesotho.

List of ambassadors
Lior Keinan (Non-Resident, Pretoria) 2017 - 
Arye Oded 
Emmanuel Ron (Non-Resident, Mbabane) 1979 - 1980
Meir Gavish (Non-Resident, Mbabane) 1976 - 1979
Charge d'Affaires a.i. Mordechai Palzur (Non-Resident, Pretoria)
Arthur Lenk (Non-Resident) 2013 - 2017

References

Lesotho
Israel